List of Portuguese football statistics for the 2001 to 2002 Season.

Primeira Liga

References
Portuguese League Association website

 
Seasons in Portuguese football